Velile Tshabalala (born 09 March 1984) is a British actress, known for portraying Kareesha Lopez in Kerching! and Rosita in the 2008 Doctor Who special "The Next Doctor".

Background
Born in Whitechapel, London, Tshabalala was raised in Ilford. She is of Zimbabwean descent. Her father is a mechanical engineer and her mother is a health visitor. She has one sister and two brothers. She trained at the Sylvia Young Theatre School, where she attended weekend classes from the age of 14.

Career
Tshabalala made her professional debut at the age of 18, in the CBBC sitcom Kerching!. She played waitress Kareesha Lopez, who did very little work and was a stereotypical teenage girl. She played several roles in all three series of the BBC Three sketch comedy Tittybangbang. She appeared as a prostitute in the 2004 short film Streets. In January 2008, she played a librarian in the ChuckleVision episode "Jumping Jackpot". She played Rosita in that year's Doctor Who Christmas special "The Next Doctor". She made her pantomime debut in the 2008 production of Dick Whittington's Cat at the Compass Theatre in Ickenham. In 2011, Tshabalala very briefly appeared in the penultimate episode of series three of the E4 series Misfits as the gangs' newest probation worker, Laura. However, she only lasted for a matter of seconds after arriving at the community centre, ultimately being killed after being bitten by a zombie. In July 2014, she completed filming on the feature film The Journey. In November 2021, it was announced that Tshabalala had been cast in the Channel 4 soap opera Hollyoaks as Viv, the mother of established character DeMarcus Westwood (Tomi Ade). In February 2022, she starred as Gloria in Running with Lions at the Lyric Theatre, London.

Filmography

References

External links
 
 

Black British actresses
1984 births
Living people
People from Whitechapel
English people of Zimbabwean descent
Alumni of the Sylvia Young Theatre School
Actresses from London
English television actresses
21st-century British actresses
21st-century English women
21st-century English people